The TomoTherapy platform is a helical radiation therapy delivery system that integrates a linear accelerator and CT technology. It delivers accurate high-quality helical fan-beam image-guided, intensity-modulated radiation therapy (IG-IMRT) from multiple 360-degree rotations around the patient as the treatment table moves. It enables accurate control of the radiation dose so it conforms precisely to the tumor and minimizes dose to healthy tissues. The TomoTherapy platform is designed to deliver image-guided 3D conformal radiation therapy (3DCRT), intensity-modulated radiation therapy (IMRT), stereotactic body radiation therapy (SBRT), and stereotactic radiosurgery (SRS).

The three main principles of this modality are: (1) integrated daily CT imaging into the treatment process, (2), continuous delivery of radiation from multiple 360-degree rotations around the patient delivering thousands of precise beams with a binary multi-leaf collimator (MLC) enabling the ability of dose painting to maximize the dose to the target and minimize dose to organs at risk (OARs) (3) advanced dose-delivery capabilities enabling the delivery of image-guided intensity modulated radiation therapy.

The TomoTherapy platform is capable of delivering radiation therapy helically also known as TomoHelicalTM and at fixed-angles also known as TomoDirectTM. TomoHelical has the advantage of treating very long volumes without a need to abut fields in the longitudinal direction. TomoDirect uses multiple static beams, each delivered from a separate fixed gantry angle, in which only the couch moves during beam delivery.

General principles

The TomoTherapy platform represented a significant advance in the radiation oncology field, specifically designed for integrated daily image-guidance with IMRT to help patients control their cancer. First generations of the machine delivered megavoltage CT (MVCT) but the Radixact Treatment Delivery System, the latest-generation platform, expands the range of 3DCRT, IMRT, SBRT and SRS treatments with helical fan-beam kilovoltage CT (kVCT) also known as ClearRT™ imaging technology.

The Radixact System 
The Radixact System provides a non-invasive option for the treatment of a wide range of cancerous and non-cancerous tumors throughout the body. The system can be used in combination with surgery, chemotherapy, and other medications.

ClearRT Helical Fan-beam kVCT Imaging 
ClearRT imaging technology is used with the Radixact System to generate clear, high-fidelity images helping to improve the clarity of the tumor and surrounding healthy tissues to deliver a treatment plan with more confidence and precision. Improved image quality facilitates precise dose delivery that will enable medical care teams to make more informed decisions about all aspects of the patient’s treatment and improve the quality of care for almost any patient who would benefit from radiation therapy.

Synchrony Technology 
The Radixact System has the option of a real-time motion synchronization and adaption technology called Synchrony. Synchrony technology is a collection of unique hardware and software technologies that enables personalized real-time adaptive delivery of radiation treatment to targets while they are in motion by synchronizing the treatment delivery beam position to the target location precisely and accurately during the delivery of a treatment fraction. If movement occurs during treatment as a result of internal or external body changes the delivery is adapted for that unique change in real-time.

History 
The TomoTherapy technique was developed in the early 1990s at the University of Wisconsin–Madison by Professor Thomas Rockwell Mackie and Paul Reckwerdt. A small megavoltage X-ray source was mounted in a similar fashion to a CT X-ray source, and the geometry provided the opportunity to provide CT images of the body in the treatment setup position. Although original plans were to include kilovoltage CT imaging, early models use megavoltage energies. With this combination, the unit was one of the first devices capable of providing modern image-guided radiation therapy (IGRT).

The first implementation of IMRT was the Corvus system developed by Nomos Corporation, with the first patient treated in April 1994. This was the first commercial system for planning and delivering intensity modulated radiation therapy (IMRT). The original system, designed solely for use in the brain, incorporated a rigid skull-based fixation system to prevent patient motion between the delivery of each slice of radiation. But some users eschewed the fixation system and applied the technique to tumors in many different parts of the body.

At this time, the systems manufactured by Accuray (previously TomoTherapy Incorporated) are the primary TomoTherapy devices in use.

Clinical Application 

Radiation therapy is a treatment option for many types of tumors throughout the body. Precise and accurate delivery of radiation to the tumor is key to killing cancerous cells while minimizing dose to healthy tissues. Accurate and precise delivery helps minimize irradiation of the healthy tissues surrounding tumors and potentially reduces the risk of side effects, which may lead to better quality of life for the patient both during and after treatment.

Helical delivery allows precise irradiation to complex volumes and long volumes without the use of junctions, which is particularly useful in cerebral spinal irradiation, total body irradiation and total marrow irradiation. Fixed-angle techniques such as TomoDirect are well suited to whole breast radiation therapy. This treatment mode confines dose delivery to tangential angles, minimizing dose to healthy tissues. Synchrony technology enables more precise treatments in the use of high-dose radiosurgery (SRS) and stereotactic body radiotherapy (SBRT).

In general, radiation therapy (or radiotherapy) has developed with a strong reliance on homogeneous dose throughout the tumor. The TomoTherapy platform enables sequential delivery of radiation to different parts of the tumor, negating the use of field matching in long treatment volumes and reducing hot and/or cold spots within the tumor. It is an advanced treatment platform that conforms dose tightly to the tumor whilst minimizing dose to healthy tissues.

Clinical Citations

Anal Cancer 

 De Bari B, Lestrade L, Franzetti-Pellanda A, Jumeau R, Biggiogero M, Kountouri M, Matzinger O, Miralbell R, Bourhis J, Ozsahin M, Zilli T. Modern intensity-modulated radiotherapy with image guidance allows low toxicity rates and good local control in chemoradiotherapy for anal cancer patients. J Cancer Res Clin Oncol. 2018 Apr;144(4):781-789.
 Joseph K, Vos LJ, Warkentin H, Paulson K, Polkosnik LA, Usmani N, Tankel K, Severin D, Nijjar T, Schiller D, Wong C, Ghosh S, Mulder K, Field C. Patient reported quality of life after helical IMRT based concurrent chemoradiation of locally advanced anal cancer. Radiother Oncol. 2016 Aug;120(2):228-33.

Bladder Cancer 

 Murthy V, Gupta P, Baruah K, Krishnatry R, Joshi A, Prabhash K, Noronha V, Menon S, Pal M, Prakash G, Bakshi G. Adaptive Radiotherapy for Carcinoma of the Urinary Bladder: Long-term Outcomes With Dose Escalation. Clin Oncol (R Coll Radiol). 2019 Sep;31(9):646-652.

Brain Metastases 

 Barra A, Agostinello A, Vagge S et al. Radiosurgery with Helical Tomotherapy: Outcomes for Patients with One or Multifocal Brain Metastasis. Technol Cancer Res Treat. 2015 Dec;14(6):693-9
 Bruni A, Gaito S, Ciarmatori A et al. Radiosurgery Using Tomotherapy for Patients with Brain Oligo-metastasis: A Retrospective Analysis on Feasibility and Tolerance. Anticancer Res. 2015 Dec;35(12):6805-12

Breast Cancer 

 Arsene-Henry A, Foy JP, Robilliard M, Xu HP, Bazire L, Peurien D, Poortmans P, Fourquet A, Kirova YM. The use of helical tomotherapy in the treatment of early stage breast cancer: indications, tolerance, efficacy-a single center experience. Oncotarget. 2018 May 4;9(34):23608-23619.
 Chitapanarux I, Nobnop W, Tippanya D, Sripan P, Chakrabandhu S, Klunklin P, Onchan W, Jia-Mahasap B, Tharavichitkul E. Clinical outcomes and dosimetric study of hypofractionated Helical TomoTherapy in breast cancer patients. PLoS One. 2019 Jan 31;14(1):e0211578.

Cervical Cancer 

 Chitapanarux I, Tharavichitkul E, Nobnop W, Wanwilairat S, Vongtama R, Traisathit P. A comparative planning study of step-and-shoot IMRT versus helical tomotherapy for whole-pelvis irradiation in cervical cancer . J Radiat Res. 2015 May;56(3):539-45. 
 Jan YT, Chang CL, Tai HC, Huang YC, Liao CL, Chen YJ. The air matters - sleeve air cavity as a marker guiding image-guided helical tomotherapy to target cervical cancer. J Contemp Brachytherapy. 2016 Feb;8(1):82-7.

Head and Neck Cancer 

 Bibault JE, Dussart S, Pommier P, Morelle M, Huguet M, Boisselier P, Coche-Dequeant B, Alfonsi M, Bardet E, Rives M, Calugaru V, Chajon E, Noel G, Mecellem H, Servagi Vernat S, Perrier L, Giraud P. Clinical Outcomes of Several IMRT Techniques for Patients With Head and Neck Cancer: A Propensity Score-Weighted Analysis. Int J Radiat Oncol Biol Phys. 2017 Nov 15;99(4):929-937.
 Chitapanarux I, Nobnop W, Sripan P, Chumachote A, Tharavichitkul E, Chakrabandhu S, Klunklin P, Onchan W, Jia-Mahasap B, Janlaor S, Kayan P, Traisathit P, Van Gestel D. The Outcome of the First 100 Nasopharyngeal Cancer Patients in Thailand Treated by Helical Tomotherapy. Radiol Oncol. 2017 Apr 21;51(3):351-356.
 Du L, Zhang XX, Feng LC, Qu BL, Chen J, Yang J, Liu HX, Xu SP, Xie CB, Ma L. Propensity score matching analysis of a phase II study on simultaneous modulated accelerated radiation therapy using helical tomotherapy for nasopharyngeal carcinomas. BMC Cancer. 2017 Aug 29;17(1):582.

Intracranial Cancer 

 Arpa D, Parisi E, Ghigi G, Savini A, Colangione SP, Tontini L, Pieri M, Foca F, Polico R, Tesei A, Sarnelli A, Romeo A. Re-irradiation of recurrent glioblastoma using helical TomoTherapy with simultaneous integrated boost: preliminary considerations of treatment efficacy. Sci Rep. 2020 Nov 9;10(1):19321. doi: 10.1038/s41598-020-75671-9. PMID: 33168845; PMCID: PMC7653937.
 Boulle G, Bracci S, Hitchcock K, Jacob J, Clausse E, Halley A, Belghith B, Kamsu Kom L, Canova CH, Bielle F, Chevalier A, Peyre M, Mazeron JJ, Maingon P, Feuvret L. Treatment of grade II-III intracranial meningioma with helical tomotherapy. J Clin Neurosci. 2019 Jan;59:190-196.

Liver Cancer 

 Jung J, Kong M, Hong SE. Conventional fractionated helical tomotherapy for patients with small to medium hepatocellular carcinomas without portal vein tumor thrombosis. Onco Targets Ther. 2014 Sep 26;7:1769-75. 
 Kim JY, Yoo EJ, Jang JW, Kwon JH, Kim KJ, Kay CS. Hypofractionated radiotheapy using helical tomotherapy for advanced hepatocellular carcinoma with portal vein tumor thrombosis. Radiat Oncol. 2013 Jan 16;8:15.

Long Fields 

 Chao M, Penagaricano J, Yan Y, Moros EG, Corry P, Ratanatharathorn V. Voxel-based dose reconstruction for total body irradiation with helical tomotherapy. Int J Radiat Oncol Biol Phys. 2012 Apr 1;82(5):1575-83. 
 Chen GY, Cheng JC, Chen YH, Lu MY, Chang HH, Yang YL, Jou ST, Hsu WM, Kuo SH. Local Control and Clinical Outcome of High-risk Pediatric Neuroblastoma Patients After Receiving Multimodality Treatment and Helical Tomotherapy. Anticancer Res. 2019 Apr;39(4):2207-2215.
 Gruen A, Ebell W, Wlodarczyk W, Neumann O, Kuehl JS, Stromberger C, Budach V, Marnitz S. Total Body Irradiation (TBI) using Helical Tomotherapy in children and young adults undergoing stem cell transplantation. Radiat Oncol. 2013 Apr 15;8:92.

Lung Cancer 

 Figlia V, Mazzola R, Cuccia F, Alongi F, Mortellaro G, Cespuglio D, Cucchiara T, Iacoviello G, Valenti V, Molino M, Verderame F, Matranga D, Casto AL, Ferrera G. Hypo-fractionated stereotactic radiation therapy for lung malignancies by means of helical tomotherapy: report of feasibility by a single-center experience. Radiol Med. 2018 Jun;123(6):406-414. 
 Scotti V, Bruni A, Francolini G, Perna M, Vasilyeva P, Loi M, Simontacchi G, Viggiano D, Lanfranchi B, Gonfiotti A, Topulli J, Olmetto E, Maragna V, Ferrari K, Bonti V, Comin C, Balduzzi S, D'Amico R, Lohr F, Voltolini L, Livi L. Stereotactic Ablative Radiotherapy as an Alternative to Lobectomy in Patients With Medically Operable Stage I NSCLC: A Retrospective, Multicenter Analysis. Clin Lung Cancer. 2019 Jan;20(1):e53-e61.

Mesothelioma 

 Harrabi SB, Koerber SA, Adeberg S, Katayama S, Herfarth K, Debus J, Sterzing F. Malignant pleural mesothelioma - Pleural cavity irradiation after decortication with helical tomotherapy. Rep Pract Oncol Radiother. 2017 Sep-Oct;22(5):402-407.
 Hong JH, Lee HC, Choi KH, Moon SW, Kim KS, Hong SH, Hong JY, Kim YS. Preliminary results of entire pleural intensity-modulated radiotherapy in a neoadjuvant setting for resectable malignant mesothelioma. Radiat Oncol J. 2019 Jun;37(2):101-109.

Prostate 

 Di Muzio NG, Fodor A, Noris Chiorda B, Broggi S, Mangili P, Valdagni R, Dell'Oca I, Pasetti M, Deantoni CL, Chiara A, Berardi G, Briganti A, Calandrino R, Cozzarini C, Fiorino C. Moderate Hypofractionation with Simultaneous Integrated Boost in Prostate Cancer: Long-term Results of a Phase I-II Study. Clin Oncol (R Coll Radiol). 2016 Aug;28(8):490-500.
 Macias VA, Barrera-Mellado I. Ultra-hypofractionated radiation therapy for unfavourable intermediate-risk and high-risk prostate cancer is safe and effective: 5-year outcomes of a phase II trial. BJU Int. 2019 Oct 15. doi: 10.1111/bju.14925.

Rectal Cancer 

 De Bari B, Franzetti-Pellanda A, Saidi A, Biggiogero M, Hahnloser D, Montemurro M, Bourhis J, Zeverino M, Ozsahin M. Neoadjuvant chemoradiotherapy delivered with helical tomotherapy under daily image guidance for rectal cancer patients: efficacy and safety in a large, multi-institutional series. J Cancer Res Clin Oncol. 2019 Apr;145(4):1075-1084.
 Huang CM, Huang MY, Tsai HL, Huang CW, Ma CJ, Lin CH, Huang CJ, Wang JY. A retrospective comparison of outcome and toxicity of preoperative image-guided intensity-modulated radiotherapy versus conventional pelvic radiotherapy for locally advanced rectal carcinoma. J Radiat Res. 2017 Mar 1;58(2):247-259.

Sarcoma 

 Peeken JC, Knie C, Kessel KA, Habermehl D, Kampfer S, Dapper H, Devecka M, von Eisenhart-Rothe R, Specht K, Weichert W, Wörtler K, Knebel C, Wilkens JJ, Combs SE. Neoadjuvant image-guided helical intensity modulated radiotherapy of extremity sarcomas - a single center experience. Radiat Oncol. 2019 Jan 9;14(1):2.
 Salfelder MA, Kessel KA, Thiel U, Burdach S, Kampfer S, Combs SE. Prospective evaluation of multitarget treatment of pediatric patients with helical intensity-modulated radiotherapy. Strahlenther Onkol. 2020 Aug 3.

Superficial 

 Cuccia F, Figlia V, Palmeri A, Verderame F, Lo Casto A, Mannino M, Ferrera G. Helical Tomotherapy® is a Safe and Feasible Technique for Total Scalp Irradiation. Rare Tumors. 2017 Mar 28;9(1):6942. 
 Chatterjee S, Mott JH, Dickson S, Kelly CG. Extensive basal cell carcinoma of the forehead and anterior scalp: use of helical tomotherapy as a radiotherapy treatment modality. Br J Radiol. 2010 Jun;83(990):538-40. doi: 10.1259/bjr/64114980.

Technical 

 Chao EH, Lucas D, Schnarr E. Evaluation of TomoTherapy dose calculations with intrafractional motion and motion compensation. Med Phys. 2018 Jan;45(1):18-28.
 Chen GP, Tai A, Keiper TD, Lim S, Li XA. Technical Note: Comprehensive performance tests of the first clinical real-time motion tracking and compensation system using MLC and jaws. Med. Phys. 47 (7), July 2020.

See also
 Radiation therapy
 Radiosurgery

References

External links 

Radiation therapy procedures
Medical physics